Elefunk is a downloadable game on the PlayStation Store developed by British studio 8bit Games.

Gameplay
Elefunk is a puzzle game, where players build bridges from various joints and slants. Resilience is tested with elephants; the bridges are built to prevent them from falling. The game has 20+ levels, various construction materials, different environments, multiplayer and online leaderboards.

There are 4 stages in the game; Waterfall, Desert (which consists of the elephants rolling down making the levels more difficult), Swamp (which consists of ropes and wooden pieces) and Circus, the final stage. At the end of each stage there is a bonus level where players control a ramp and try to reach a target.

Reception

Elefunk received mixed reviews from critics upon release. On Metacritic, the game holds a score of 70/100 based on 14 reviews, indicating "mixed or average reviews". On GameRankings, the game holds a score of 70.62% based on 13 reviews.

References

External links
 Gamasutra preview
 Developer website

2008 video games
PlayStation 3-only games
PlayStation Network games
Puzzle video games
Sony Interactive Entertainment games
PlayStation 3 games
Multiplayer and single-player video games
Video games developed in the United Kingdom